MSC Gülsün at the time of her launch in 2019 was the world's largest container ship. With a cargo system  designed by MacGregor International AB the ship has a capacity of 23,756 containers (23,756 TEU) in rows of 24 across. MSC Gülsün is registered in Panama and operated by the Mediterranean Shipping Company based in Geneva, Switzerland and The Netherlands.

References

Container ships
2019 ships